Madison Township is a township in Harrison County, in the U.S. state of Missouri.

Madison Township most likely was named after President James Madison.

References

Townships in Missouri
Townships in Harrison County, Missouri